Piet J. Kroonenberg (9 May 1927 - 7 September 2016) was a Scouting historian and was the historical consultant to the European Scout Committee. He had written books and articles  about Scouting during World War II and post-War Scouting in Central and Eastern Europe.

Biography
Kroonenberg participated in the Dutch Resistance . Kroonenberg served in the Canadian Army from 1944-1947.

Kroonenberg was a Dutch Scoutmaster and Scouting historian. Kroonenberg had been active in Scouting since 1935 and attended the 5th World Scout Jamboree in Vogelenzang, Bloemendaal, the Netherlands, in 1937.  Kroonenberg was awarded the Bronze Wolf by the World Scout Committee for exceptional services to world Scouting, in 1996, for his outstanding contributions to International Scouting. Kroonenberg was also awarded the highest Russian Scout distinction, the Order of the Bronze Beaver.

His books The Forgotten Movements and The Undaunted, as well as numerous articles, chronicle the history of Scouting in Europe, particularly that of Scout organizations in exile.

Kroonenberg died at age 89, on 7 September 2016.

Publications

Books

Articles

References

External links

Scouting in World War II Netherlands

1927 births
2016 deaths
20th-century Dutch historians
Recipients of the Bronze Wolf Award
Scouting and Guiding in the Netherlands